"With Your Love" is a song written by Marty Balin, Joey Covington and Vic Smith. The song was first recorded by Jefferson Starship and was the lead single of their 1976 album Spitfire. In the US, the single peaked at number 12 on the Billboard Hot 100 and number 6 on the Adult Contemporary chart. It was also a top-ten hit in Canada.

Reception
Cash Box said that "it's a hook-filled ballad, Balin's vocal is packed with emotion and the arrangement has some healthy jazz influences readily apparent" with "great answering backup vocals on the chorus."

Chart performance

Weekly charts

Year-end charts

Cover versions
Balin released a new version on his 1999 solo album, Marty Balin Greatest Hits.

References

1976 singles
Songs written by Marty Balin
Jefferson Starship songs
1976 songs
RCA Records singles